The Seattle Cascades Drum and Bugle Corps is a World Class competitive junior drum and bugle corps. Based in Seattle, Washington, the Cascades is a member corps of Drum Corps International.

History

The all-male Greenwood Boys Club Drum and Bugle (D&B) Corps was founded in 1957 by Jack Avery in Seattle’s Greenlake area. In 1958, Roderick Stubbs became the director of the corps and changed the name to the Seattle Thunderbirds. With no other drum corps in their region, the corps existed as a parade and stand-still exhibition unit. The corps raised money to support its operations by holding bingo games at the Greenlake VFW, which became one of the corps’ sponsors. After witnessing the 1963 VFW Junior D&B National Championship (Nationals) in Seattle, the Thunderbirds' leadership decided to put the corps on the competition field.

1964 was a groundbreaking year for the Seattle Thunderbirds. Under the leadership of George Laumin and Jack Little, the corps entered the field with a program of show tunes and modern field drill. They traveled to Cleveland for VFW Nationals, where the corps placed 32nd among 45 corps. Additionally, the corps started a feeder corps and named it the Thunderbird Cadets, under the direction of Rod Stubbs and Jack Avery, with the major performance during its inaugural season being the Rose Festival Parade in Portland, Oregon.

In 1966, Rod Stubbs left the Thunderbird organization, and with some of its marching members, started a new corps, named the Cascade Cadets. In 1970, many staff and marching members of the Seattle Thunderbirds defected to the Cascade Cadets, which then changed its name to the Seattle Cascades, After the 1972 season, the remnants of the Thunderbirds organization were absorbed into the Seattle Cascades. In 1977, for the first time, the Cascades traveled to DCI Finals in Denver, also attending American Legion Nationals in the Denver suburbs.  Although they had some competitive success in its early days, some years the organization struggled to put a corps on the field.

In 1985, the corps reorganized as a Class A60 (later Division III [DIII]) corps. They then returned to marching parades until 1991, when they returned to the competition field in Class A60. In 1992, the corps moved into Division II (DII), moving up to a 6th-place finish in the division in 1996 before taking another year off to reorganize. The corps returned as a DII corps, earning a 9th-place finish in 1998 and 6th in 1999. In 2000, the corps stepped down to DIII and were crowned DCI Division III World Champions. In 2001, the corps membership nearly doubled, and the corps finished a close 2nd to Mandarins in DII, advanced to the Division I (DI) preliminary competition, and gained a 17th-place ranking in DCI.

In 2002, the Seattle Cascades moved into DI (now World Class) competition and became the first corps from the Pacific Northwest to earn a place in the DCI Top Twelve Finals.

Sponsorship
The Seattle Cascades Drum and Bugle Corps is sponsored by Northwest Youth Music Association, a 501(c)(3) musical organization. The Executive Director is Brian M. Smith, and Tour Director is Jeremy Bennett.

Show summary (1972–2023) 
Source:

Traditions

Corps Song 
"Imagine" by John Lennon

References

External links
 Official website

Drum Corps International World Class corps
Musical groups established in 1957
Organizations based in Seattle